True Golf Classics: Waialae Country Club is a golfing game developed and published by T&E Soft. It was released in 1991 for the Super Nintendo Entertainment System and PC-9800 Series.

Setting
The game is based on the prestigious Waialae Country Club in Hawaii.

Release
It was a launch game for the Super NES in North America in 1991. It was released in Japan for the Mega Drive in 1994. It is part of T&E Soft's True Golf series. Later in the series, set on the same course, is Waialae Country Club: True Golf Classics for the Nintendo 64.

Gameplay
Players can choose a golfer, assign him a caddie, pick a set of golf clubs, and adjust the game stats to personal preference.

Reception
In the United States, it became the top-selling 3DO game in November 1994. Next Generation reviewed the 3DO version, rating it three stars out of five, and stated that "Waialae is all the more enjoyable for enabling you to sport eighteen holes without having to wear stupid pants and talk merger deals."

It was reviewed in SuperGamePower in December 1994, and in Games World: The Magazine in February 1995.

Notes

References

1991 video games
Golf video games
Multiplayer and single-player video games
NEC PC-9801 games
Satellaview games
Sega Genesis games
Super Nintendo Entertainment System games
T&E Soft games
Video games developed in Japan
Video games set in Hawaii